The  was a naval gun used by the Imperial Japanese Navy before and during World War II. The gun was first used in single casemates on the Kongō-class battlecruisers and Fusō-class battleships and later in the Agano-class light cruisers in twin mountings.

History
The Type 41 was a Japanese version of the Vickers "Mark M", originally introduced by Vickers-Armstrong (Barrow) as the secondary battery for the Kongō-class. These original guns were designated by the Japanese Navy as the "Mark II", whereas the Japanese-designed copy (adopted from 1912) were designated as the "Mark III".

In the 1930s, the Kongō-class were modernized, at which time these guns were replaced by new 12.7 cm/40 DP guns. The old guns were placed in storage and were reused on the Agano-class. Some were taken to Guam and were used for coastal defense batteries.

In the Agano-class, the gun could elevate to 55° for anti-aircraft fire; however, its manual loading method allowed a rate of fire of only about 6 rounds per minute, which significantly limited its utility as an anti-aircraft weapon.

See also

Weapons of comparable role, performance and era
 BL 6 inch Mk XI naval gun : British Empire equivalent naval gun
 6"/50 caliber gun : US equivalent

References

Bibliography

External links

 Tony DiGiulian, Japanese 6"/50 (15.2 cm) Vickers Mark M 6"/50 (15.2 cm) Mark II and Mark III 15 cm/50 (6") 41st Year Type

World War II naval weapons
Naval guns of Japan
152 mm artillery